What a Terrible Thing to Say is the second full-length album from the post-hardcore band Four Letter Lie.

Background and production
In November 2007, the band performed at Saints & Sinners Festival. Sessions for What a Terrible Thing to Say were held at Glow in the Dark Studios in Atlanta, Georgia. Matt Goldman served as producer, alongside handling recording and mixing. Alan Douches mastered the album at West West Side.

Release
What a Terrible Thing to Say was released on February 19, 2008, through Victory Records. In February and March 2008, the band went on a US tour alongside Silverstein, the Devil Wears Prada, Protest the Hero and A Day to Remember. In October and November, the band supported Pierce the Veil on their headlining US tour. In December, the band went on an East Coast tour with This Is Hell, Evergreen Terrace and Casey Jones. Videos have been released for "Cake Eater" and "Nothing But a Ghost". The album is the group's last record with Kevin Skaff and Derek Smith.

Track listing
All songs written by Kevin Skaff and Derek Smith, all music arranged by Four Letter Lie, all lyrics written by Brian Nagan and Skaff.

Personnel
Personnel per booklet.

Four Letter Lie
 Brian Nagan – vocals
 Kevin Skaff – guitar, vocals
 John Waltmann – bass
 Connor Kelly – guitar
 Derek Smith – drums, percussion, additional programming (track 10)

Additional musicians
 Matt Goldman – additional percussion, keyboards, programming
 Jeremy Griffith – programming (track 1)

Production and design
 Matt Goldman – producer, recording, mixing
 Alan Douches – mastering
 Doublej – art direction, layout
 Tony Maldonado – illustrations
 Matt Wysocki – band photography

References

External links
Official Website
Official MySpace Profile

2008 albums
Four Letter Lie albums
Albums produced by Matt Goldman